The Carling World Open was the last incarnation in a series of golf tournaments on the PGA Tour sponsored by the Carling Brewing Company beginning in 1953.

Winners

References

Former PGA Tour events